This is a list of episodes for the television program The Danny Thomas Show, which was titled Make Room for Daddy for the first three seasons.  All episodes were filmed in black-and-white.

Series overview
At present, only seasons five and six have been released on DVD.

Episodes

Season 1 (1953–54)

Season 2 (1954–55)

Season 3 (1955–56)

Season 4 (1956–57)

Season 5 (1957–58)

Season 6 (1958–59)

Season 7 (1959–60)

Season 8 (1960–61)

Season 9 (1961–62)

Season 10 (1962–63)

Season 11 (1963–64)

References

External links
 
 

Danny Thomas Show